The women's Europe at the 2000 Summer Olympics was held from 20 to 29 September 2000 at the Olympic Sailing Shore Base in Sydney Harbour. Points were awarded for placement in each race. Eleven races were scheduled and sailed. Each sailor had two discards.

Race schedule

Course area and course configuration

Weather conditions

Final results

Daily standings

Further reading

References

External links
 Results – World Sailing

Europe
Europe (dinghy) competitions
Women's events at the 2000 Summer Olympics
Olym